The 2005 Sky Bet World Grand Prix was the eighth staging of the World Grand Prix darts tournament, organised by the Professional Darts Corporation. It was held at the Citywest Hotel in Dublin, Ireland, between 24–30 October 2005.

Phil Taylor won his sixth Grand Prix title, defeating defending champion Colin Lloyd in the final.

Prize money

Seeds

Draw

References

World Grand Prix (darts)
World Grand Prix Darts